Michael Bookie (September 12, 1904 – October 12, 1944) was a U.S. soccer midfielder.  He was a member of the U.S. team at the 1930 FIFA World Cup and is a member of the National Soccer Hall of Fame.

Professional career
Bookie began his athletic career as a minor league baseball player playing shortstop in Pittsburgh.  He then joined several amateur soccer clubs, including Jeannette F.C. in western Pennsylvania before signing with the Boston Wonder Workers of the American Soccer League in 1924.  In January 1925, he moved to Vestaburg SC where he finished out the season.  In the fall of 1925, returned to the ASL, this time with the New Bedford Whalers. He saw time in only four games with the Whalers.  From February through April 1927, he played for American Hungarian.  In December 1929, he moved to Cleveland Slavia of the Mid-West Professional League.  Bookie was with Slavia when selected to the U.S. 1930 World Cup team.  In March 1931, he left Cleveland Slavia.  He may have played for other Cleveland teams before finishing his career with Pittsburgh Curry Silver Tops.

National team
While selected to the U.S. roster for the 1930 FIFA World Cup, Bookie never entered a game in the cup.  After Argentina eliminated the U.S. in the semifinals, the U.S. went on a tour of Uruguay and Brazil.  In the only official international game of the tour, Bookie earned his only national team cap in a 4–3 loss to Brazil.

He enlisted in the Army in 1944 and died after being accidentally killed by machine gunfire during a training simulation.

He was inducted into the National Soccer Hall of Fame in 1986.

References

External links
 National Soccer Hall of Fame profile

1904 births
1944 deaths
1930 FIFA World Cup players
American soccer players
United States men's international soccer players
American Soccer League (1921–1933) players
Boston Soccer Club players
New Bedford Whalers players
National Soccer Hall of Fame members
Cleveland Slavia players
Soccer players from Pittsburgh
Association football forwards
United States Army Air Forces personnel killed in World War II
Accidental deaths in Florida
Deaths by firearm in Florida
United States Army Air Forces soldiers
Firearm accident victims in the United States